Koshcheyevo is a rural locality (a village) in Sizemskoye Rural Settlement, Sheksninsky District, Vologda Oblast, Russia. The population was 21 as of 2002.

Geography 
Koshcheyevo is located 59 km north of Sheksna (the district's administrative centre) by road. Kiselyovo is the nearest rural locality.

References 

Rural localities in Sheksninsky District